The 2018 MercedesCup was a men's tennis tournament played on outdoor grass courts. It was the 41st edition of the Stuttgart Open, and part of the ATP World Tour 250 series of the 2018 ATP World Tour. It was held at the Tennis Club Weissenhof in Stuttgart, Germany, from 11 June until 17 June 2018. First-seeded Roger Federer regained the ATP no. 1 singles ranking by reaching the final.

Singles main draw entrants

Seeds 

 1 Rankings are as of May 28, 2018

Other entrants 
The following players received wildcards into the singles main draw:
  Tomáš Berdych
  Yannick Maden
  Rudolf Molleker

The following players received entry from the qualifying draw:
  Prajnesh Gunneswaran
  Denis Kudla
  Matteo Viola
  Mikhail Youzhny

The following player received entry as a lucky loser:
  Viktor Galović

Withdrawals 
Before the tournament
  Marco Cecchinato → replaced by  Denis Istomin
  Peter Gojowczyk → replaced by  Viktor Galović
  Chung Hyeon → replaced by  Maximilian Marterer
  David Ferrer → replaced by  Mirza Bašić
  Gaël Monfils → replaced by  Florian Mayer

Retirements 
  Viktor Troicki

Doubles main draw entrants

Seeds 

 Rankings are as of May 28, 2018

Other entrants 
The following pairs received wildcards into the doubles main draw:
  Matthias Bachinger /  Yannick Maden
  Philipp Petzschner /  Tim Pütz

Finals

Singles 

  Roger Federer defeated  Milos Raonic, 6–4, 7–6(7–3)

Doubles 

  Philipp Petzschner /  Tim Pütz defeated  Robert Lindstedt /  Marcin Matkowski, 7–6(7–5), 6–3

References

External links 
 
 ATP tournament profile

Stuttgart Open
Stuttgart Open
2018 in German tennis
June 2018 sports events in Germany